Mee siam is a dish of thin rice vermicelli of hot, sweet and sour flavours, originated in Penang but popular among the Malay and Peranakan communities throughout Peninsular Malaysia and Singapore, although the dish is called "Siamese noodle" in Malay and thus appears to be inspired or adapted from Thai flavours when Thailand was formerly known as Siam. Mee siam is related to kerabu bee hoon although there is a significant difference in the recipe.

History
According to Wendy Hutton, due to the Thai influence on Northern Malaysian cuisine, it is believed that the dish originates from Penang, where Thai influences on Malay and Peranakan dishes are common. Dishes from Penang possess Thai influences, such as more liberal use of tamarind and other sour ingredients including dishes like mee siam and asam laksa. 

As Singapore was established in the early 1800s, many straits Chinese families from Penang moved to Singapore, thus introducing the dish to Singapore.

Variation
There are many known variants of Mee Siam in Malaysia such as the dry-fried version in Johor, the wet version in Malacca, as well as other places like Kuala Lumpur, Mersing, Kedah and Perlis. The "dry" version is more commonly found, which is essentially stir frying the rice noodles with the same ingredients used in the wet version. Mee Siam is a common dish as breakfast, brunch or lunch in Malaysia. They are usually served along any of the followings sides: Malaysia's fried chicken, fried or boiled egg, speciality sambal, otak-otak (grilled fish cake made of groundfish meat mixed with tapioca starch and spices), and luncheon meat.

In Singapore, it is served with spicy, sweet and sour light gravy. The gravy is made from a rempah spice paste, tamarind and tauco (salted soybean). Mee Siam is typically garnished with a shredded omelette, scallions, bean sprouts, garlic chives, and lime wedges. A "dry" version is sometimes more commonly found, which is essentially stir frying the rice noodles with the same ingredients.

Similar dish
In Thailand, a very similar dish is known as Mi Kathi (noodles with coconut milk), a noodle dish that is popularly eaten as lunch in the Central Region. It is made by stir-frying rice vermicelli noodles with a fragrant and thick sauce that has a similar taste profile as Mee Siam. 

The sauce is made from coconut milk mixed with minced pork, prawns, firm bean curd, salted soybean, bean sprouts, garlic chives, and tamarind. It is served with thinly sliced egg omelette, fresh bean sprouts, fresh garlic and banana blossom.

Similar noodles in Laos is known as Mee ka tee.

See also
 Malay cuisine
 Peranakan cuisine

References

Bibliography

	

Malaysian noodle dishes
Singaporean noodle dishes
Fried noodles
Mixed noodles